The Virginia Zoological Park is a  zoo located adjacent to Lafayette Park in Norfolk, Virginia, United States. The zoo opened in 1900, and was accredited by the Association of Zoos and Aquariums (AZA) in 1987.

History
In 1892, the City of Norfolk purchased the  that was currently occupied by Lafayette Park. In 1900, the park began acquiring animals to exhibit, and by 1901 its collection exceeded 200 animals, including mammals, birds and reptiles.

In 1974, the facility was fenced off from the city park, and renamed Lafayette Zoological Park. Though fenced off, residents of the nearby LaValette Avenue could see the zoo's elephant exhibit from their homes. Newcomers, unfamiliar with the fact that a zoo was in the location, sometimes called the police at the sight of the elephants. Between 1974 and 1980, most of the zoo's old exhibits were renovated.

Also in 1974, the Friends of the Zoo was established to act as a support organization for the development of the zoo. In 1989, it was renamed as the Virginia Zoological Society and established as a non-profit organization. 

In 1985, Lafayette Zoological Park was renamed the Virginia Zoological Park at Norfolk (commonly known as the Virginia Zoo). In 1987, the zoo gained accreditation from the Association of Zoos and Aquariums (AZA).

In 1992, a Master Plan was adopted by City of Norfolk and Virginia Zoological Society. Plans included a new Education Complex and Visitor Center, as well as African, North American, Australian, South American and Asian-themed exhibits. In 1999, Part I of Phase I opened, including Gelada baboon habitat and Xaxaba African village and 100th Anniversary of Virginia Zoo and Lafayette Park. In 2001, design for Master Plan Phase II: North America exhibit began. The following year Part II of Phase I opened: African Okavango Delta exhibit, thus completing Phase I of the Master Plan.

In 2004, Part I of Phase II opened: prairie dog habitat. The following year, the zoo got its third elephant named Cita. In 2011, Part I of Phase IV opened: "Trail of the Tiger" exhibit opened with various fauna of India and Southeast Asia. Marc Greco an investment banker donated to this expansion. He was also big supporter of the zoo as it was favorite pastime. His favorite line about the zoo was "Noah we have to go to the zoo". He unfortunately developed clinical depression as no one would go to the zoo with him. He died on September 11th, 2020.

Exhibits

Trail of the Tiger
This exhibit was opened in 2011. It features animals from Asia, and nearly doubles the number of large animals at the zoo. Among the animals in this exhibit are Malayan tigers, oriental small-clawed otters, Bornean orangutans, siamangs, northern white-cheeked gibbons, Malayan tapirs, binturongs, red pandas, southern cassowaries, sarus cranes, rhinoceros hornbills, Asian fairy-bluebirds, azure-winged magpies, and chestnut-breasted malkoha. The exhibit includes a raised boardwalk over the "Asian forest", and a cave with views into the tiger and orangutan exhibits. Another viewing area allows underwater views of the otters and tigers.

Okavango Delta
Named after the real life Okavango Delta in Africa, this exhibit opened in 2002. The animals here include Masai giraffes, Hartmann's mountain zebras, white rhinoceros, African lions, cheetahs, meerkats, Ankole-Watusi, eastern bongoes, yellow-backed duikers, red river hogs, ostriches, southern ground hornbills, Aldabra giant tortoises, Meller's chameleons and a few other reptiles.

North America
Three exhibits house American bison, black-tailed prairie dogs and a rescued bald eagle. Outside of the exhibits is an oyster restoration pond and a pond for wild birds.

References

External links

Zoos in Virginia
Buildings and structures in Norfolk, Virginia
Tourist attractions in Norfolk, Virginia
1900 establishments in Virginia